Five Go to Billycock Hill is the sixteenth novel in the Famous Five series by Enid Blyton. It was first published in 1957.

Plot
The Five are camping on Billycock Hill, near the farm of Toby, a boy who loves jokes and pranks. When Toby's cousin Jeff, a Royal Air Force pilot, and Jeff’s friend Ray are reported to have defected and stolen the newest aeroplanes, the Five and Toby are shocked. The media later reports Jeff and Ray crashed their planes and drowned at sea. Toby refuses to believe that Jeff was a spy, as he had always seemed a trustworthy man. The Five attempt to comfort the distraught Toby. Later that day, Toby's younger brother Benny's pet piglet, Curly, appears with a message leading the children to find Jeff and Ray imprisoned in Billycock Caves. The children then rescue the pair.

Characters
Julian – oldest of the Five
Dick – brother to Julian
Georgina (George) – cousin of Julian, Dick and Anne. She is a tomboy
Anne – younger sister of Julian and Dick
Timmy – George's faithful dog
Toby – an amusing boy from Julian’s and Dick’s school
Mrs Thomas – Toby’s mother, a kind and hard working farmer’s wife
Mr Thomas – farmer and dad to Toby
Benny – Toby’s younger brother, a funny little boy who says "runned" instead of "ran"
Curly – a funny, curious pig belonging to Benny
Jeff – Toby’s cousin, a pilot, of whom Toby is proud and brags about
Ray – another pilot who also vanishes
Mr Gringle – the strange and absent-minded owner of the Butterfly Farm
Mr Brent – business partner of Mr Gringle
Will Janes – a criminal who lives at the Butterfly Farm. He used to do odd jobs before he made friends with the wrong folk
Mrs Janes – a poor witch-like woman who was always under attack by her son Will Janes

Adaptations
The gamebook The Secret Airfield Game (1986) was based on this novel.

External links
 
Five Go To Billycock Hill at www.enidblyton.net
Enid Blyton Society page

1957 British novels
1957 children's books
Hodder & Stoughton books
Famous Five novels